Lewistown Armory is a historic National Guard armory located at Derry Township, Mifflin County, Pennsylvania.  It was built in 1938, and is a one-story, "I"-plan brick building with an exposed basement executed in the Colonial Revival style. It consists of a front administrative section with a drill hall and former stable area behind. The front and stable buildings have hipped roofs, while the drill hall has a gable roof.  The drill hall measures 60 feet by 90 feet.

It was added to the National Register of Historic Places in 1991.

References

Armories on the National Register of Historic Places in Pennsylvania
Colonial Revival architecture in Pennsylvania
Infrastructure completed in 1938
Buildings and structures in Mifflin County, Pennsylvania
National Register of Historic Places in Mifflin County, Pennsylvania
1938 establishments in Pennsylvania